Hermann Simon (born 10 February 1947) is a German author and businessperson. He is chairman of Simon-Kucher & Partners, a strategy and marketing consultancy. He is a strategy, marketing and pricing consultant. An ongoing online German-language survey voted him the second-most influential management thinker. Simon has authored numerous books and writes articles for international newspapers and business magazines.

Short biography

 1947 Born in Hasborn/Eifel, Germany
 1966 High School leaving A-levels certificate, Cusanus High School, Wittlich
 1967-1969 German Air Force, fighter bomber squadron 33, reserve officer
 1969-1973 Studies of economics and business administration in Cologne and Bonn
 1974-1979 Ph.D. and qualification as a university professor under Horst Albach in Bonn
 1979-1989 Professor at the University of Bielefeld
 1989-1995 Professor at the University of Mainz
 1983-2002 Various guest professorships and visiting researcher positions: Massachusetts Institute of Technology (1978/79), Vienna Institute for Advanced Studies (1979), Keio University in Tokyo (1983), Stanford University (1984), INSEAD in Fontainebleau (1980–1985), Harvard Business School (1988/89), London Business School (1991–2002)
 1985-1988 Director, USW The German Management Institute, Schloss Gracht/Cologne
 1985	Founded the company Simon - Kucher & Partners Strategy & Marketing Consultants
 1995-2009 CEO of Simon - Kucher & Partners Strategy & Marketing Consultants
 Since 2009 Chairman of Simon - Kucher & Partners Strategy & Marketing Consultants

Career
Simon's career spans three professions in his work as a management consultant, business professor, and author. His books have been translated into 25 languages and are widely read among managers. An ongoing online survey votes him a most-influential management thinker, second only to Peter Drucker. Simon was inducted into the Thinkers50 Hall of Fame in 2019.

Management consultant
He was CEO of Simon-Kucher & Partners strategy and marketing consultants from 1995 until 2009. His consulting firm focuses on strategy, marketing, pricing and sales. Bloomberg BusinessWeek described Simon-Kucher & Partners as a "world leader in giving advice to companies on how to price their products", and The Economist wrote that "Simon-Kucher is the world's leading pricing consultancy".

Author
Simon's books are widely read among managers and have been translated into 25 languages.  In March 2011, Simon and co-author Martin Fassnacht were awarded the 2010 Georg-Bergler-Prize for Preismanagement. Carrying with it a €20000 prize, this is the most highly endowed award for European marketing textbooks.

In 2006, Simon published Manage for Profit, Not for Market Share, which takes a critical look at the widespread focus on volume and market share and calls for a conscious shift of focus towards profit.

Simon's most well-known publications include Think (2004), Power Pricing (1997), Hidden Champions (1996), Hidden Champions of the 21st Century (2009) and Preismanagement (3rd edition 2009). Additional publications include Das große Handbuch der Strategieinstrumente (2002), Das große Handbuch der Strategiekonzepte (2000) and Simon for Managers (2000).

Simon has coined a number of phrases which are commonly used in management theory and practice, including "price management", "hidden champions", "Servicewüste" and "investor marketing".

Since 1988, Simon has regularly authored a column for the German monthly Manager Magazin.

He is a member of the editorial boards of numerous business journals, including the International Journal of Research in Marketing, Management Science, Recherche et Applications en Marketing, Décisions Marketing, European Management Journal and several German journals.

Works

Books
 
 
 
 
 

 (published in 14 languages)
 (published in 15 languages)

Selected articles

Other

References

External links
 
 Simon-Kucher & Partners official website

Living people
1947 births
Academics of London Business School
University of Cologne alumni
University of Bonn alumni
Academic staff of Bielefeld University
Academic staff of Johannes Gutenberg University Mainz
Harvard Business School faculty
Stanford University faculty
German non-fiction writers
German business theorists
German economists
German male non-fiction writers